Shantilal Kothari also spelt as Shanti Lal  was  an Indian politician. He was a Member of Parliament, representing Rajasthan in the Rajya Sabha the upper house of India's Parliament as a member of the Indian National Congress.

References

Rajya Sabha members from Rajasthan
Indian National Congress politicians
1924 births
2000 deaths